McCoy was a British heavy metal band from the new wave of British heavy metal era. John McCoy also led his own band under the simple name McCoy during the 1980s, which has been integrated with members of bands like Iron Maiden, Samson and Gillan.

The band was formed by John McCoy before he went to play in Gillan. Paul Samson would later form Samson.

Discography 
Oh Well (single), 1983
McCoy, 1983
Think Hard, 1984
Think Hard... Again, 1998 – A compilation of Think Hard and McCoy with two additional tracks
Brainstorm, 1999
Live 1977, 2000
Unreal - The Anthology (Compilation), 2007

Band members 
First Line-Up
John McCoy – bass guitar
Paul Samson† – lead guitar and vocals
Roger Hunt – drums

Other members
Nikki Brooks – vocals
T-Bone Rees – vocals
Mark Keen† - guitar, backing vocals
Al Romano – guitar, lead vocals
Steve Linton – guitar
Mike Sciotto – drums
Bobby Rondinelli – drums
Liam Genockey – drums
Ron Rebel – drums
Colin Towns – keyboards

See also
List of new wave of British heavy metal bands

References

External links
McCoy at Rockdetector
Greene, Jo-Ann "[ Unreal: The Anthology Review]", Allmusic, Macrovision Corporation

English heavy metal musical groups
New Wave of British Heavy Metal musical groups
Musical groups from London